Made in Europe is a live album released by Deep Purple, recorded on the final dates in April 1975 before Ritchie Blackmore left Deep Purple. It was released in October 1976, after the group had broken up.

Recording
Made in Europe features songs recorded in concert 4 April in Graz, Austria, 5 April in Saarbrücken, Germany, and 7 April 1975 at Palais des Sports in Paris, France with the Rolling Stones Mobile Studio.  According to the liner notes included on Mk III: The Final Concerts, though, the material featured on Made in Europe came, for the most part, from the Saarbrücken show. The album is said to have experienced extensive studio editing and/or overdubbing of crowd noise and applause. Certainly there is a tape-loop of applause, given away by a whistling fan.

The songs featured on the album are from Deep Purple's Burn and Stormbringer albums.

In 1990, the album was remastered and re-released in the US by Metal Blade Records with distribution by Warner Bros.

This record, which had been out of print in the US, was re-released by Friday Music label on 31 July 2007 (along with Stormbringer and Come Taste the Band). While the label's website claims that the album has been digitally remastered, it is unclear which tapes were used as a source for this release.

The Graz and Paris concerts, of which some of the content for this release is sourced, have been released in full (for unexplained reasons, the drum solo from the Graz concert is missing) by Deep Purple (Overseas) Limited and Ear Music.

In 2014, a "super deluxe" boxset of the album was announced, promising to contain the entire Saarbrücken show for the first time, as well as a new MK 3 documentary movie. However, as of July 2019, no news or updates have been made about its release.

Track listing
All songs written by Ritchie Blackmore and David Coverdale except where noted.

Personnel
Deep Purple
Ritchie Blackmore – lead guitar
David Coverdale – lead vocals
Glenn Hughes – bass and vocals
Jon Lord – Hammond organ and keyboards
Ian Paice – drums

Additional Personnel
Produced by Deep Purple and Martin Birch
Engineered by Mick Mckenna, Tapani Tapanainen and Martin Birch
Mixed by Ian Paice and Martin Birch

Charts

References

Albums produced by Martin Birch
1976 live albums
Deep Purple live albums
Warner Records live albums
Purple Records live albums